Ziarat (also Romanized as Zīārat, Zeyārāt, and Zīyārat) is a village in Ziarat Rural District of the Central District of Dashtestan County, Bushehr province, Iran. At the 2006 census, its population was 2,903 in 668 households. The following census in 2011 counted 3,027 people in 833 households. The latest census in 2016 showed a population of 2,758 people in 859 households; it was the largest village in its rural district.

References 

Populated places in Dashtestan County